The 2015–16 GFA First Division League is the  season of second-tier football in the Indian state of Goa. It began on 1 February 2016. Corps of Signals are the champions. They are promoted to Goa Professional League next season.

Teams

Top Scorers

References

External links 
Goa Professional League 2015-2016
Goa Pro League page at Goa Football Association website

Goa Professional League seasons
4